The N-240 is a major east-west highway in Spain.  It goes from Tarragona to Bilbao.  It will be upgraded to the Autovía A-10.

The road heads south east from Bilbao over Pto de Barazar (604m) to Vitoria.  There it joins the Madrid-Francia highway the N-I to Pamplona.  There it follows the rivers Eloz and Aragón to Jaca.  It then joins the N-330 south to Huesca.  

The road heads out of the foothills of the Pyrenees through Barbastro and Monzón to Lleida.  Thereafter it passes through Montsant and the Sierra de Roquerole to Montblanc.  It then passes along the valley of the river Francolí to Tarragona.

Roads in Catalonia
National roads in Spain